Gotta Tell You is the debut studio album by Irish singer Samantha Mumba. It was released on 31 October 2000 by Polydor Records, Interscope Records, Wildcard Records and A&M Records.

Album covers
The original album cover featured a darkly lit close-up shot of Mumba's face. A&M Records president Ron Fair made the decision to release the album in the United States with a new cover which had Mumba positioned in front of a bright colourful portrait, as he wanted it to be easily identifiable and express Mumba's true personality. The re-issued album incorporated two re-recorded songs; "Baby, Come Over (This Is Our Night)" and "The Boy", which featured Will.i.am from The Black Eyed Peas, while two songs were removed. It was released in the US on 27 March 2001.

Critical reception

Writing for AllMusic, Stephen Thomas Erlewine praised Mumba's vocals for sounding "richer" than other teen pop artists, stating that Gotta Tell You is soulful and well-constructed. However, he stated that the album contained several unmemorable songs. Laura Morgan of Entertainment Weekly considered Mumba to be the Irish equivalent of Christina Aguilera and Britney Spears. Although she criticized the album's reliance on production over her personality, Morgan praised her seductive voice in songs such as "Lately" and "Body II Body". For his "Consumer Guide" reviews, Robert Christgau gave the album a dud rating.

Track listing
 

 
 
 
Notes
 signifies a co-producer
Some European editions of the reissue have the song "Never Meant to Be" removed.

Charts

Weekly charts

Year-end charts

Certifications

Release history

References

2000 debut albums
Samantha Mumba albums
A&M Records albums
Polydor Records albums
Albums produced by Teddy Riley
Albums produced by Stargate